Patrick or Pat Williams may refer to:

Politics
 Pat Williams (Montana politician) (born 1937), member of the US House of Representatives from Montana, 1979–1997
 Patrick Williams (Louisiana politician) (born 1963), member of the Louisiana House of Representatives

Sports
 Patrick Williams (cricketer) (1912–1981), English cricketer
 Pat Williams (basketball) (born 1940), American basketball executive, senior vice-president of Orlando Magic
 Pat Williams (American football) (born 1972), American football defensive tackle for the Buffalo Bills and Minnesota Vikings
 Patrick Williams (fighter) (born 1981), American MMA fighter
 Patrick Williams (wide receiver) (born 1986), American football player for the Baltimore Ravens
 Patrick Williams (basketball) (born 2001), American basketball player for the Chicago Bulls

Other
 Patrick Williams (composer) (1939–2018), American composer of orchestral works, and songs and themes for film and television
 Pat Williams (director), Canadian television director
 Pat Ward Williams (born 1948), African-American photographer

See also
Williams (surname)
William Patrick (disambiguation)
Bill Patrick (disambiguation)